Very high frequency (VHF) is the ITU designation for the range of radio frequency electromagnetic waves (radio waves) from 30 to 300 megahertz (MHz), with corresponding wavelengths of ten meters to one meter. 
Frequencies immediately below VHF are denoted high frequency (HF), and the next higher frequencies are known as ultra high frequency (UHF).

VHF radio waves propagate mainly by line-of-sight, so they are blocked by hills and mountains, although due to refraction they can travel somewhat beyond the visual horizon out to about 160 km (100 miles). Common uses for radio waves in the VHF band are Digital Audio Broadcasting (DAB) and FM radio broadcasting, television broadcasting, two-way land mobile radio systems (emergency, business, private use and military), long range data communication up to several tens of kilometers with radio modems, amateur radio, and marine communications. Air traffic control communications and air navigation systems (e.g.

In the Americas and many other parts of the world, VHF Band I was used for the transmission of analog television. As part of the worldwide transition to digital terrestrial television most countries require broadcasters to air television in the VHF range using digital, rather than analog encoding.

Propagation characteristics
Radio waves in the VHF band propagate mainly by line-of-sight and ground-bounce paths; unlike in the HF band there is only some reflection at lower frequencies from the ionosphere (skywave propagation).  They do not follow the contour of the Earth as ground waves and so are blocked by hills and mountains, although because they are weakly refracted (bent) by the atmosphere they can travel somewhat beyond the visual horizon out to about 160 km (100 miles). They can penetrate building walls and be received indoors, although in urban areas reflections from buildings cause multipath propagation, which can interfere with television reception.  Atmospheric radio noise and interference (RFI) from electrical equipment is less of a problem in this and higher frequency bands than at lower frequencies.  The VHF band is the first band at which efficient transmitting antennas are small enough that they can be mounted on vehicles and portable devices, so the band is used for two-way land mobile radio systems, such as walkie-talkies, and two way radio communication with aircraft (Airband) and ships (marine radio).  Occasionally, when conditions are right, VHF waves can travel long distances by tropospheric ducting due to refraction by temperature gradients in the atmosphere.

Line-of-sight calculation

VHF transmission range is a function of transmitter power, receiver sensitivity, and distance to the horizon, since VHF signals propagate under normal conditions as a near line-of-sight phenomenon. The distance to the radio horizon is slightly extended over the geometric line of sight to the horizon, as radio waves are weakly bent back toward the Earth by the atmosphere.

An approximation to calculate the line-of-sight horizon distance (on Earth) is:
distance in nautical miles =  where  is the height of the antenna in feet 
distance in kilometers =  where  is the height of the antenna in meters. 

These approximations are only valid for antennas at heights that are small compared to the radius of the Earth. They may not necessarily be accurate in mountainous areas, since the landscape may not be transparent enough for radio waves.

In engineered communications systems, more complex calculations are required to assess the probable coverage area of a proposed transmitter station.

Antennas

VHF is the first band at which wavelengths are small enough that efficient transmitting antennas are short enough to mount on vehicles and handheld devices, a quarter wave whip antenna at VHF frequencies is 25 cm to 2.5 meter (10 inches to 8 feet) long. So the VHF and UHF wavelengths are used for two-way radios in vehicles, aircraft, and handheld transceivers and walkie-talkies. Portable radios usually use whips or rubber ducky antennas, while base stations usually use larger fiberglass whips or collinear arrays of vertical dipoles.

For directional antennas, the Yagi antenna is the most widely used as a high gain or "beam" antenna. For television reception, the Yagi is used, as well as the log-periodic antenna due to its wider bandwidth. Helical and turnstile antennas are used for satellite communication since they employ circular polarization. For even higher gain, multiple Yagis or helicals can be mounted together to make array antennas. Vertical collinear arrays of dipoles can be used to make high gain omnidirectional antennas, in which more of the antenna's power is radiated in horizontal directions. Television and FM broadcasting stations use collinear arrays of specialized dipole antennas such as batwing antennas.

Universal use
Certain subparts of the VHF band have the same use around the world. Some national uses are detailed below.
50–54 MHz: Amateur Radio 6-meter band.
108–118 MHz: Air navigation beacons VOR and Instrument Landing System localizer.
118–137 MHz: Airband for air traffic control, AM, 121.5 MHz is emergency frequency
144–146 MHz: Amateur Radio 2-meter band (Extends up to 148 MHz in some Regions).
156–174 MHz: VHF maritime mobile band for maritime two-way radio on ships.

By country

Australia

The VHF TV band in Australia was originally allocated channels 1 to 10-with channels 2, 7 and 9 assigned for the initial services in Sydney and Melbourne, and later the same channels were assigned in Brisbane, Adelaide and Perth. Other capital cities and regional areas used a combination of these and other frequencies as available. The initial commercial services in Hobart and Darwin were respectively allocated channels 6 and 8 rather than 7 or 9.

By the early 1960s it became apparent that the 10 VHF channels were insufficient to support the growth of television services. This was rectified by the addition of three additional frequencies-channels 0, 5A and 11. Older television sets using rotary dial tuners required adjustment to receive these new channels. Most TVs of that era were not equipped to receive these broadcasts, and so were modified at the owners' expense to be able to tune into these bands; otherwise the owner had to buy a new TV.

Several TV stations were allocated to VHF channels 3, 4 and 5, which were within the FM radio bands although not yet used for that purpose. A couple of notable examples were NBN-3 Newcastle, WIN-4 Wollongong and ABC Newcastle on channel 5. While some Channel 5 stations were moved to 5A in the 1970s and 80s, beginning in the 1990s, the Australian Broadcasting Authority began a process to move these stations to UHF bands to free up valuable VHF spectrum for its original purpose of FM radio. In addition, by 1985 the federal government decided new TV stations are to be broadcast on the UHF band.

Two new VHF channels, 9A and 12, have since been made available and are being used primarily for digital services (e.g. ABC in capital cities) but also for some new analogue services in regional areas. Because channel 9A is not used for television services in or near Sydney, Melbourne, Brisbane, Adelaide or Perth, digital radio in those cities are broadcast on DAB frequencies blocks 9A, 9B and 9C.

VHF radio is also used for marine Radio as per its long-distance reachability comparing UHF frequencies.

Example allocation of VHF–UHF frequencies: 
 Radionavigation 60: 84–86 MHz
 Fixed Maritime Mobile: 130–135.7 MHz
 Fixed Aeronautical radio navigation: 160–190 MHz
 Broadcasting Aeronautical Radionavigation:  255–283.5 MHz
 Aeronautical Radionavigation AUS 49 / Maritime Radionavigation (radiobeacons) 73: 315–325 MHz

New Zealand
44–51, 54–68 MHz: Band I Television (channels 1–3)
87.5–108 MHz: Band II Radio
118–137 MHz: Airband for air traffic control, AM
108–117.975 MHz: Air navigation beacons VOR and ILS
121.5 MHz is an emergency frequency
144–148 MHz: Amateur radio 2-meter band
156–162.2 MHz: Marine radio 
174–230 MHz: Band III Television (channels 4–11)

Until 2013, the four main free-to-air TV stations in New Zealand used the VHF television bands (Band I and Band III) to transmit to New Zealand households. Other stations, including a variety of pay and regional free-to-air stations, were forced to broadcast in the UHF band, since the VHF band had been very overloaded with four stations sharing a very small frequency band, which was so overcrowded that one or more channels would not be available in some smaller towns.

However, at the end of 2013, all television channels stopped broadcasting on the VHF bands, as New Zealand moved to digital television broadcasting, requiring all stations to either broadcast on UHF or satellite (where UHF was unavailable) utilising the Freeview service.

Refer to Australasian television frequencies for more information.

United Kingdom

British television originally used VHF band I and band III. Television on VHF was in black and white with 405-line format (although there were experiments with all three colour systems-NTSC, PAL, and SECAM-adapted for the 405-line system in the late 1950s and early 60s).

British colour television was broadcast on UHF (channels 21–69), beginning in the late 1960s. From then on, TV was broadcast on both VHF and UHF (VHF being a monochromatic downconversion from the 625-line colour signal), with the exception of BBC2 (which had always broadcast solely on UHF). The last British VHF TV transmitters closed down on January 3, 1985. VHF band III is now used in the UK for digital audio broadcasting, and VHF band II is used for FM radio, as it is in most of the world.

Unusually, the UK has an amateur radio allocation at 4 metres, 70–70.5 MHz.

United States and Canada
Frequency assignments between US and Canadian users are closely coordinated since much of the Canadian population is within VHF radio range of the US border. Certain discrete frequencies are reserved for radio astronomy.
The general services in the VHF band are:

30–49.6 MHz: Licensed 2-way land mobile communication, with various sub-bands.
30–88 MHz: Military VHF FM, including SINCGARS
43–50 MHz: Cordless telephones, 49 MHz FM walkie-talkies and radio controlled toys, and mixed 2-way mobile communication. The FM broadcast band originally operated here (42–50 MHz) before it was moved to 88–108 MHz.
50–54 MHz: Amateur radio 6-meter band
50.8–51 MHz: Radio-controlled aircraft (on ten fixed frequencies at 20 kHz spacing) with an FCC Amateur Radio Service license, flown under FCC Part 97, rule 97.215. 
54–88 MHz, known as "Band I" internationally; some DTV stations will appear here. See Pan-American television frequencies.
54–72 MHz TV channels 2–4 (VHF-Lo)
72–76 MHz: Radio controlled models, industrial remote control, and other devices. Model aircraft operate on 72 MHz while surface models operate on 75 MHz in the US and Canada, air navigation beacons 74.8–75.2 MHz.
76–88 MHz TV channels 5–6 (VHF-Lo)
87.5–108 MHz: FM radio broadcasting (87.9–91.9 non-commercial, 92–108 commercial in the United States) (known as "Band II" internationally)
108–118 MHz: Air navigation beacons VOR
118–137 MHz: Airband for air traffic control, AM
121.5 MHz is an emergency frequency
137–138 MHz Space research, space operations, meteorological satellite
138–144 MHz: Land mobile, auxiliary civil services, satellite, space research, and other miscellaneous services
144–148 MHz: Amateur radio 2-meter band
148–150 MHz: Land mobile, fixed, satellite
150–156 MHz: "VHF business band," public safety, the unlicensed Multi-Use Radio Service (MURS), and other 2-way land mobile, FM
156–158 MHz VHF Marine Radio
156.8 MHz (Channel 16) is the maritime emergency and contact frequency.
 159.81-161.565 MHz railways  
159.81–160.2 are railroads in Canada only and is used by trucking companies in the U.S.
160.6–162 Wireless microphones and TV/FM broadcast remote pickup
162.4–162.55: NOAA Weather Stations, narrowband FM, Weatheradio Canada Stations
174–240 MHz, known as "Band III" internationally. A number of DTV channels have begun broadcasting here, especially many of the stations which were assigned to these channels for previous analog operation.
174–216 MHz television channels 7–13 (VHF-Hi)
174–216 MHz: professional wireless microphones (low power, certain exact frequencies only)
216–222 MHz: land mobile, fixed, maritime mobile,
222–225 MHz: 1.25 meters (US) (Canada 219–220, 222–225 MHz) amateur radio
225 MHz and above (UHF): Military aircraft radio, 243 MHz is an emergency frequency (225–400 MHz) AM, including HAVE QUICK, dGPS RTCM-104

Cable television, though not transmitted aerially, uses a spectrum of frequencies overlapping VHF.

VHF television
The U.S. FCC allocated television broadcasting to a channelized roster as early as 1938 with 19 channels. That changed three more times: in 1940 when Channel 19 was deleted and several channels changed frequencies, then in 1946 with television going from 18 channels to 13 channels, again with different frequencies, and finally in 1948 with the removal of Channel 1 (analog channels 2–13 remain as they were, even on cable television). Channels 14–19 later appeared on the UHF band, while channel 1 remains unused.

87.5–87.9 MHz
87.5–87.9 MHz is a radio frequency which, in most of the world, is used for FM broadcasting. In North America, however, this bandwidth is allocated to VHF television channel 6 (82–88 MHz). The analog audio for TV channel 6 is broadcast at 87.75 MHz (adjustable down to 87.74). Several stations, known as Frankenstations, most notably those joining the Pulse 87 franchise, have operated on this frequency as radio stations, though they use television licenses. As a result, FM radio receivers such as those found in automobiles which are designed to tune into this frequency range could receive the audio for analog-mode programming on the local TV channel 6 while in North America. The practice largely ended with the DTV transition in 2009, although some still exist.

The FM broadcast channel at 87.9 MHz is normally off-limits for FM audio broadcasting; it is reserved for displaced class D stations which have no other frequencies in the normal 88.1–107.9 MHz subband to move to. So far, only two stations have qualified to operate on 87.9 MHz: 10–watt KSFH in Mountain View, California and 34–watt translator K200AA in Sun Valley, Nevada.

Unlicensed operation
In some countries, particularly the United States and Canada, limited low-power license-free operation is available in the FM broadcast band for purposes such as micro-broadcasting and sending output from CD or digital media players to radios without auxiliary-in jacks, though this is illegal in some other countries. This practice was legalised in the United Kingdom on 8 December 2006.

See also
Marine VHF radio
TV radio
List of oldest radio stations
Apex (radio band)
FM broadcast band
Moving image formats
Polar mesosphere summer echoes
Television channel frequencies
Knife-edge effect
Instrument Landing System
VHF omnidirectional range
 High frequency
 Low frequency
 Extremely low frequency
 Ultra low frequency

Notes

References

Radio spectrum
Television terminology